Mays Lick ( Mayslick, originally known as May's Lick) is census-designated place and unincorporated community located in Mason County, Kentucky, United States, about nine miles southwest of Maysville.

Demographics

History

Local Government Officials:

The Mayor of May's Lick is Joe Jolly. The Vice Mayor is Devin Hull. The Constable is Joe Collins. 

May's Lick was founded in 1788 by the following six families from Scotch Plains, New Jersey. 

 Abraham Drake (1751–1805)
 Cornelius Drake (1754–1833)
 Isaac Drake (1756–1832), father of (i) Daniel Drake (1785–1852), American physician and author, and (ii) Benjamin Drake (1795–1841), American historian, editor, and writer; Daniel Drake's son, Charles Daniel Drake (1811–1892), was a United States Senator from Missouri and an anti-slavery politician
 David Morris (1746–1798) and wife, Mary  Shotwell (1748–1806)
 John Shotwell (1753–1826) and wife, Abigail  Shipman (1754–1835)

 Note 1: Abraham, Cornelius, and Isaac Drake were brothers
 Note 2: John and Mary Shotwell were siblings

The group purchased 1,400 acres of land from William May (for whom the community was named) near the salt lick in southern Mason county and began to build a community. The Mays Lick Post Office opened in 1800.  Kentucky's first consolidated school and first school transportation – consisting of a horse and wagon – was founded in Mays Lick.

When May's Lick was founded (1788), Kentucky was part of the Commonwealth of Virginia. That year (1788), the Commonwealth of Virginia established Mason County. May's Lick became the name of the town after first being called May's Spring.

Mays Lick Consolidated School
The Mays Lick Consolidated School was constructed in 1909–1910 for $32,500  The building was the first high school in Mason County and until 1960, was the only public high school to serve the Mays Lick District.  In 1982, the building was added to the National Register of Historic Places.

Also see: May's Lick Negro School

The May family
The same May family for whom the Mason County Seat (Maysville) is named is also the namesake for May's Lick.

 Mays Lick is named after John's brother, William May.
 Maysville is named after John May ( –1790).

The May brothers
 George May ( –1795), a surveyor
 William May
 Charles May
 John May ( –1790)
 Gabriel May (1751–1813), married to Sallie Stokes (Susannah May Stokes, 1759–1815), niece of Ethan Allen (1738–1789), the hero of Ticonderoga and Crown Point

Notable residents
 Joseph Desha (1768–1842), a US Representative and the ninth governor of Kentucky
 Daniel Drake (1785–1852), American physician, author
 Benjamin Drake (1795–1841), American historian, editor, and writer
 John McLean (1785–1861), Associate Justice, US Supreme Court from 1830 to 1861
 William McLean (1794–1839), Ohio legislator
 Charles Young (1864 - 1922), Third African-American graduate of West Point, first black U.S. national park superintendent, first black man to achieve the rank of colonel in the US Army.

See also
 Fox Farm site (Mays Lick, Kentucky)

References

External links
 Mayslick history, online

Census-designated places in Mason County, Kentucky
Populated places established in 1788
Unincorporated communities in Kentucky
Census-designated places in Kentucky
1788 establishments in Virginia